Clockwise is an absurdist 1986 British comedy road film starring John Cleese, directed by Christopher Morahan, written by Michael Frayn and produced by Michael Codron. The film's music was composed by George Fenton.

For his performance Cleese won the 1987 Peter Sellers Award For Comedy at the Evening Standard British Film Awards. Most urban scenes were shot in the West Midlands, Yorkshire and Lincolnshire, while rural scenes were largely shot in Shropshire. Menzies High School in West Bromwich was used to portray the fictional school within the film.

Plot
Brian Stimpson, headmaster of Thomas Tompion Comprehensive School, has been elected to chair the annual Headmasters' Conference meeting in Norwich. Openly careless as a young man, Stimpson is now compulsively organised and punctual and his school runs "like clockwork". Stimpson is the first headmaster of a comprehensive school to chair the Headmasters' Conference, that honour usually being reserved for heads of the more prestigious private schools.

Despite constant rehearsal of his speech and preparations for the journey to the conference, Stimpson's ordered world unwinds as a series of unfortunate circumstances delay him en route. He mistakenly boards the wrong train, missing his connection for Norwich, owing to a lingering habit of saying "right" as emphasis in situations where it would be mistaken for a direction; then, in his desperation to board the departing correct train, he leaves the text of his speech behind on the wrong one, and is finally left at the railway station by his wife, who thinks he departed on the train.

Determined to get to Norwich on time, Stimpson searches for his wife at home and then at the hospital where she volunteers looking after dementia patients, but narrowly misses her. Attempting to hail a taxi, Stimpson stumbles across Laura Wisely, one of his sixth form students, who is driving and playing truant during a study break; he commandeers her and her car in a bid to drive to Norwich.

Stimpson's wife sees the two at a petrol station, assuming that her husband is carrying on with the student and taking her down to attend the conference. Mrs. Stimpson, who is still looking after three senile old women, drives after Stimpson and both parties forget to pay for their petrol. The police are called and, responding to a call from Laura's parents reporting the car as stolen and their daughter as missing, attempt to find Stimpson and arrest him for kidnapping. Stimpson's wife, Laura's parents, the police and Mr. Jolly, a music teacher at Thomas Tompion who has secretly been dating Laura, all pursue Stimpson and Laura to the conference.

Taking a break, Stimpson and Laura try to call the conference from a telephone box. A local mistakes them for vandals after Stimpson vents his frustrations at the malfunctioning phones, and calls the police. The local sends her daughter Pat to Stimpson, but she turns out to be a childhood friend and former girlfriend of Stimpson. Stimpson coerces her into driving them to the conference.

After a series of wrong turns, the group desperately turn into a farmer's field in order to escape cows and a lorry, and shortly after get stuck in deep mud. Brian leaves the stuck car to seek help, and ends up at a monastery where he is persuaded to take a bath and collect himself. While he's gone, a local farmer tugs the car out of the mud; Pat finally drives away in the car but is soon arrested for assaulting a police officer. All the while, Stimpson's wife and the others arrive at the conference uninvited, much to the horror of the headmasters; they attempt to sequester the growing group of concerned parents, wives, senile ladies and police officers as the conference continues.

Stranded without transport, Laura and Stimpson (who is dressed in monks' robes, leaving his muddy suit with the monks) attempt to hitchhike. They are picked up by a wealthy car salesman, whom they persuade to come for a walk in the woods. They trick the traveller into swapping clothes with Stimpson under the guise of foreplay, but Stimpson and Laura run away and steal his car.

Stimpson finally arrives at the conference in the torn suit of the car salesman and delivers an improvised recount of his lost speech, which becomes increasingly mocking and oppressive in tone to the disappointed headmasters. During his speech various characters including the old women, Mr. Jolly and Laura's parents walk into the hall, and Stimpson addresses them like he would late pupils, ordering and humiliating the entire collected group with the same authoritarian demeanour with which he runs his own school. Finally, he directs all of the headmasters to stand and sing the hymn "To Be a Pilgrim", as he walks out of the building to face the police. The headmasters watch on as Stimpson and the rest of the party are all led away by policemen, with Stimpson still giving headmasterly orders to all the officers in the car.

Cast 
 John Cleese as Brian Stimpson
 Penelope Wilton as Pat
 Alison Steadman as Gwenda Stimpson
 Stephen Moore as Mr. Jolly
 Sharon Maiden as Laura Wisely
 Benjamin Whitrow as Headmaster
 Geoffrey Palmer as Headmaster
 Peter Cellier as Headmaster
 Nicholas Le Provost as Headmaster
 Joan Hickson as Mrs. Trellis
 Pat Keen as Mrs Wisely
 Constance Chapman as Mrs. Wheel
 Ann Way as Mrs. Way
 Tony Haygarth as Ivan with the tractor
 John Bardon as ticket collector
 Michael Aldridge as Prior
 Sheila Keith as Pat's mother
 Mark Burdis as Glen Scully
 Nadia Sawalha as Mandy Kostakis
 Richard Ridings as Policeman at crash
 Alan Parnaby as Policeman at phone box

Production
The film was an original script by Michael Frayn, then better known as a novelist and playwright. Frayn wrote it on "spec". He said, "I had always wanted to write something about a man who is late because I have considerable problems in relation to that myself, and only get places early by enormous expenditure of psychic energy."

He showed it to theatrical producer Michael Codron, who had produced five Frayn works on stage including the hugely successful Benefactors and Noises Off, and asked if Codron would like to produce it. "I said, 'Why not?'" said the producer. "I've always been interested in movies."

Codron showed the script to Nat Cohen at EMI Films who gave it to the company's head of production Verity Lambert and she agreed to finance. The title was originally Man of the Moment but this was changed when it was realised that had been used for a Norman Wisdom film.

John Cleese was signed to star. "No one will believe it but I didn't have an idea for casting," said Frayn.

Cleese later said the script was "the best I've ever seen. The same day it landed on my front door, I rang my agent and said, 'I have to do this.' "

"Stimpson is a victim of circumstance," Cleese said. "As the pressures increase, his behavior becomes more and more erratic. Comedy is about things always going wrong, and that's just what happens to him. When you first see him, he's in charge. But as events take over and he can't cope-that's when he falls apart."

Codron, Cleese and Lambert had a meeting to decide the director. They selected Chris Morahan, who had directed Frayn's Chekov adaptation Wild Honey on stage and had recently directed Jewel in the Crown for TV.

Filming took eight weeks in June and July 1985 in Hull, Shropshire and Birmingham.

Reception
On review aggregator Rotten Tomatoes, the film has an approval rating of 80% based on 5 reviews.

Halliwell's Film Guide awarded it one star from a possible four, stating "what was intended as an escalating climax of comic chaos falls away as the script runs out of steam, but the nation's need for comedy ensured box-office success". Radio Times reviewer John Ferguson awarded it three stars out of five, stating "Cleese finds it difficult to be unfunny and he unravels here much like Basil Fawlty, from a simmering starting point to a climax of epic proportions. Perhaps because of Cleese's background in TV comedy, the picture is less a narrative than a series of sketches, plus some rather awkwardly placed propaganda about public and private education in that far-off land called Mrs Thatcher's Britain." He concluded that it was "entertaining fare" but "doesn't stand comparison" with Cleese's next comedy film, A Fish Called Wanda (1988).

Film writer David Harkin stated that "on its original release, some of the more quaint and colloquial English humour failed to find an international audience, which Cleese would remedy in his next film by importing American stars and adding a much brasher style of comedy into A Fish Called Wanda".

Although popular in Britain, the film only played art houses in the US. This prompted Cleese to make A Fish Called Wanda to be accessible to American audiences, to "get out of the art houses" there. Cleese later recalled "there was a scene where I had to make a call from a public phone booth. None of the phones worked and I had to go from booth to booth with increasing fury before I found one that did. In England, that scene got a big laugh because no one here expects the phones to work. But it played to total silence in America, where they all expect to get through on a phone the first time."

References

External links 

 

1986 films
1986 comedy films
British comedy films
EMI Films films
Films about educators
Films directed by Christopher Morahan
Films scored by George Fenton
1980s English-language films
1980s British films